Disruptor may refer to:

Disruptor (comics), multiple DC Comics characters
Disruptor (software), an open-source software technology 
Disruptor (Star Trek weapon), a weapon in television series Star Trek
Disruptor (video game), is a video game for the Sony PlayStation
Disruptor Records, an American record label
Endocrine disruptor, chemicals that interfere with endocrine systems
Photonic Disruptor, a model of the dazzler non-lethal directed radiation weapon
Projected water disruptor, a type of bomb disposal equipment
A catalyst of disruptive innovation

See also
Disruption